Mudhaykhirah is a sub-district located in Mudhaykhirah District, Ibb Governorate, Yemen. Mudhaykhirah had a population of 5,319 according to the 2004 census.

References 

Sub-districts in Mudhaykhirah District